Chin Chum (born 7 October 1985) is a former Cambodian footballer. He played as a striker.

He has represented Cambodia at senior international level.

Honours

Club
Nagacorp FC
Cambodian League: 2009
Hun Sen Cup: 2013

Individual
Hun Sen Cup Best player: 2013

International goals

References

External links
 

1985 births
Living people
Cambodian footballers
Cambodia international footballers
Association football forwards
Phnom Penh Crown FC players
Nagaworld FC players